The RS-platform Chrysler minivans are a short- and long-wheelbase passenger minivans marketed by Chrysler from model years 2001–2007, as the fourth generation Chrysler minivans, heavily revised versions of their predecessors, the NS minivans. 

The RS generation introduced a breakthrough fold-flat seating concept marketed as Stow 'N Go seating, available exclusively on long-wheelbase models. 

Marketed variously as the Dodge Caravan, Chrysler Town & Country, and the Chrysler Voyager — the RS generation was coincided with the discontinuation of the Plymouth brand and the Plymouth Voyager. RS minivans received a mild facelift in 2005.

Overview
In development from February 1996 to December 1999, the Generation IV minivans were based on the Chrysler RS platform and featured a larger body frame with modified headlights and taillights. Design work by Brandon Faurote was approved in January 1997 and reached production approval in October 1997. Unveiled at the 2000 North American International Auto Show (NAIAS) on Monday, January 10, 2000, the RS minivans were released for sale in August 2000. The release was part of a promotional tie-in with Nabisco, which unveiled their new "Mini Oreos" inside the van during the unveiling. The first vans rolled off the line at the Windsor Assembly Plant on July 24.

The RS minivans were marketed as the Dodge Caravan, Chrysler Voyager and Chrysler Town & Country, in 4 door body styles. The Caravan was available in a long wheelbase model, called the Grand Caravan, while the Chrysler Voyager was a short wheelbase model with base levels of equipment and the Town & Country was only available with a long wheelbase and was the highest end model. The U.S. market Chrysler Voyager was originally intended to be a Plymouth, but became a Chrysler with the discontinuation of the Plymouth brand in 2000. This model was also exported, while the Town & Country was exported as a high-level model of the Voyager. Export models had the platform designation RG.

Trim levels for the Caravan and Town & Country were carried over from the previous generation, while the Voyager was only offered in a base model. The Caravan was available in Base, SE, Sport and ES trims, and the Town & Country was available in LX, LXi and Limited. In addition to other detailed changes, remote operated sliding doors and rear hatch, which could be opened and closed at the push of a button, either inside the vehicle, or with the keyless entry fob, became options, as well as a new tri-zone climate control system and side seat mounted airbags. In 2002, the value-packed eL and eX models were added to the Town & Country. These models were both value-priced versions of the LX and LXi, respectively, with popular option packages.

In 2003, the Chrysler Voyager was discontinued in the U.S., a short wheelbase Town & Country became available, and the Caravan C/V and Grand Caravan C/V returned after having been discontinued in 1995. The C/V featured the option of deleted side windows (replaced by composite panels), optional rear seats, a cargo floor made of plastic material similar to pickup truck bedliners, rubber flooring in lieu of carpeting and normal hatch at the rear. Minor changes were made to the Grand Caravan ES including many of the features included in Option Group 29S becoming standard, the 17 inch Titan Chrome wheels no longer being an option replaced with standard 16 inch chrome wheels, and the disappearance of the AutoStick Transmission option. This year also saw the appearance of an optional factory-installed rear seat DVD system with single disc player mounted below the HVAC controls, and the addition of a SXT model. 2004 offered an exclusive one year only "Anniversary Edition" package to mark Caravan's 20th year in production. This package was offered on higher level SXT models, and included chrome wheels, body color moldings, special interior accents and a unique fender badge.

The 2005 minivans received a mid-cycle refresh including revised front fascias and a mildly restyled interior. This model introduced a system of second- and third-row seating that folded completely into under-floor compartments, marketed as Stow 'N Go seating and available exclusively on long-wheelbase models. 

Trim levels were again reshuffled on the Town & Country, being available in a short-wheelbase base model, and long-wheelbase LX, Touring and Limited models. As with the pre-refresh model, only the Touring and Limited were sold to consumers in Canada, the LX being restricted to fleets. A driver's side knee airbag was now standard on all models. The front seat-mounted side airbags of previous years were discontinued in favor of side-curtain airbags for all three rows. These were standard on Limited trim and optional on all other models, however could not be ordered with the moonroof option. Uconnect Bluetooth phone pairing was now available, as well as an overhead rail storage system with three moveable or removable compartments.

Taiwanese-market Town & Country minivans were assembled between 2005 and 2007 in Yangmei, Taiwan under license by the China Motor Corporation, starting with the 2006 model year. They were based on the RG variant Grand Voyager for global market. Taiwanese models featured minor variations for the local market including LED taillights, backup cameras and mirror-mounted turn signals. In 2007, production ended and the production line was relocated to China where Soueast continued to assemble it under the Chrysler Grand Voyager and Dodge Grand Caravan nameplates from 2007 until late 2010.

Production of this generation continued in China under the Chrysler Grand Voyager and Dodge Grand Caravan nameplates from 2007, when the Taiwanese Town & Country production line was relocated to Soueast (a joint venture between CMC, Mitsubishi Motors and the Fujian Motors Group, until late 2010 when the facelifted fifth generation Chrysler Grand Voyager was introduced there. The Grand Caravan was replaced in this market by the JCUV. The Chinese Grand Voyager was identical to the Taiwanese Town & Country, while the Grand Caravan was not based on the RS Grand Caravan sold in the United States and Canada. Instead, it was a modified version of the Grand Voyager with a new grille, incandescent taillights instead of the Grand Voyager's LED units, fender-mounted turn signals instead of mirror-mounted units, and wheels from the RS Grand Caravan. Chinese models were equipped with Mitsubishi 6G72 engines.

Stow 'N Go seating
In 2004, Chrysler introduced a system of second- and third-row seating that folded completely into under-floor compartments, marketed as Stow 'N Go and available exclusively on long-wheelbase models.

In a development program costing $400 million, engineers initially used an Erector Set to visualize the complex interaction of the design and redesigned under-floor components. The system included the spare tire well, fuel tank, exhaust system, parking brake cables, rear climate control lines, and rear suspension but precluded all-wheel drive (AWD).

The Stow 'n Go system received the Popular Science Magazine's "Best of What's New" for 2005 award, and was never offered on the Volkswagen Routan, the rebadged nameplate variant of the Chrysler minivans.

For the subsequent minivan generation, beginning in model year 2011, Chrysler revised the system, rebranding it as "Super Stow 'n Go". New pivoting head restraints with taller seatbacks and a revised folding mechanism (marketed as "single action") improved stowage ease – with the head restraints folding on themselves automatically and the entire seat automatically folding down to a position just over its floor recess.

Safety
The 2001 model of this version earned a "Poor" rating in the Insurance Institute for Highway Safety's 40 mph offset test. It did protect its occupants reasonably well, and the dummy movement was well controlled, however, a fuel leak occurred. Chrysler corrected this problem starting with the 2002 models, moving it up to an "Acceptable" rating.

The 2006 model year brought optional side curtain airbags and a stronger B-pillar, which was tested by the Insurance Institute for Highway Safety's side impact crash test. With the side airbags, it got an "Acceptable" rating. For the driver, there is a chance of serious neck injuries, rib fractures, and/or internal organ injuries. The rear passengers, however, could leave this accident unharmed, as there is a low risk of significant injury in a crash of this severity for them.

The 4th generation Town & Country (Grand Voyager, as it is known in Europe))right hand drive (RHD) version performed very poorly in the Euro NCAP car safety tests and achieved the following ratings:

However, it was noted that "The LHD car performed significantly better than the RHD car in the frontal impact, scoring 9 points, giving a potential four star adult occupant rating."
Thatcham's New Car Whiplash Ratings (NCWR) organization tested the 4th generation European Grand Voyager for its ability to protect occupants against whiplash injuries with the car achieving an 'Acceptable' rating overall.

Powertrains
As with the previous generation, the Caravan came standard with a 2.4 L EDZ I4 and a 3-speed TorqueFlite automatic transmission, with optional 3.3 L EGA and 3.8 L EGH V6 engines, which came with a 4-speed Ultradrive automatic transmission. The 3.3L V6 was the standard engine on the Voyager and Town & Country, as well as Canadian Caravans, where the 2.4L wasn't offered. Export models could be equipped with a 2.5 L Turbo Diesel R 425 or a 2.8 L Turbo Diesel R 428 from VM Motori, and were available with a 5-speed manual transmission. Chinese models got a 3.0 L 6G72.

 2007–2010 3.0 L Mitsubishi 6G72'' V6,   (China)

References

External links

All-wheel-drive vehicles
Caravan
Chrysler vehicles
Flexible-fuel vehicles 
Front-wheel-drive vehicles
Minivans
Cars introduced in 2000
Cars discontinued in 2010